Below are the rosters for the 2011 CONCACAF U-20 Championship held in Guatemala from March 28 – April 10, 2011.

Group A

Guatemala
Coach:  Ever Hugo Almeida

Honduras
Coach:  Javier Padilla

Jamaica
Coach:  Walter Gama

Group B

Panama
Coach:  Jose Alfredo Poyatos

Suriname
Coach:  Harold Deyl

United States
Coach:  Thomas Rongen

Group C

Canada
Coach:  Valerio Gazzola

Costa Rica
Coach:  Ronald Gonzalez

Guadeloupe
Coach:  Steve Bizasene

Group D

Cuba

Mexico
Coach:  Juan Carlos Chávez

Trinidad and Tobago
Coach:  Zoran Vraneš

References

CONCACAF Under-20 Championship squads
squads